The Women's scratch competition at the 2022 UCI Track Cycling World Championships was held on 12 October 2022.

Results
The race was started at 20:00. First rider across the line without a net lap loss won.

References

Women's scratch